Gorgoleptis is a genus of sea snails, marine gastropod mollusks in the family Lepetodrilidae.

Species
Species within the genus Gorgoleptis include:

 Gorgoleptis emarginatus McLean, 1988
 Gorgoleptis patulus McLean, 1988
 Gorgoleptis spiralis McLean, 1988

References

External links

Lepetodrilidae